Robert Lovell "Bob" Murdoch (born January 29, 1954) is a Canadian former professional ice hockey winger.

Career 
Murdoch played 260 games in the National Hockey League (NHL) with the California Golden Seals, Cleveland Barons, and St. Louis Blues. Murdoch is the brother of Don Murdoch.

Career statistics

External links
 

1954 births
Living people
Adirondack Red Wings players
California Golden Seals players
Canadian ice hockey forwards
Cleveland Barons (NHL) players
Edmonton Oil Kings (WCHL) players
Ice hockey people from British Columbia
Sportspeople from Cranbrook, British Columbia
St. Louis Blues players
Salt Lake Golden Eagles (CHL) players
Undrafted National Hockey League players
Canadian expatriate ice hockey players in the United States